Uruguay has a multi-party system with three dominant political parties, with extreme difficulty for anybody to achieve electoral success under the banner of any other party. It may be said that to some extent the 'fault lines' of Uruguay's politics have run within the historically dominant Colorado and National parties. Uruguay underwent an intermittent series of civil wars through much of the 19th century, which ended in 1904, and the party system has in the past reflected regional loyalties which emerged during that period. However, with the eclipse in 2004 of the Colorado Party and, indeed, the cooperation of the Colorado and National parties during the 1999 Presidential elections, some realignment of traditional loyalties has come into play. However, the independence of both parties is maintained by members of Colorado and National parties.

The participation of leading figures from both the Colorado and the National parties in the civilian-military administrations of 1973-1985 may have played a role in causing long-term traditional party loyalties to shift somewhat. Critics of these two parties may argue that they have to some extent been compromised with the past willingness of some of their prominent members to work with the civilian-military administrations of 1973-1985. Supporters may argue that in the difficult circumstances of the years in question such participation as was afforded by Colorado and National members to the civilian-military administrations was against the background of political figures (from both EP-FA-NM and National parties, such as Liber Seregni and Wilson Ferreira Aldunate) who were exiled and/or incarcerated, thus playing no part at all in the country's affairs until circumstances were more fortuitous for them. Furthermore, Ferreira Aldunate and Seregni were banned from participating in the first "return to democracy" elections of 1984, where Julio María Sanguinetti was elected.

Economic problems also may have substantially contributed to the Uruguayan electorate's willingness in 2004 to move away from the traditional parties.

Factionalism is strong in all of Uruguay's major parties. The Broad Front is in fact a coalition of autonomous political parties that vary in ideological outlook, while the Colorado and National parties are also composed of divergent factions with autonomous identities within those parties.

The parties

Parties represented in the General Assembly
Broad Front (Frente Amplio) (1971–present)
Uruguay Assembly (Asamblea Uruguay) (1994–present)
Broad Front Confluence (Confluencia Frenteamplio)
Current 78 (Corriente 78)
Movement of Popular Participation (Movimiento de Participación Popular) (1989–present)
Christian Democratic Party of Uruguay (Partido Demócrata Cristiano del Uruguay) (1962–present)
Communist Party of Uruguay (Partido Comunista del Uruguay) (1920–present)
Party of the Communes (Partido de los Comunes)
Socialist Party of Uruguay (Partido Socialista del Uruguay) (1910–present)
Artiguista Fall (Vertiente Artiguista) (1989–present)
Progressive Alliance (Alianza Progresista) (1999–present)
New Space (Nuevo Espacio) (1994–present)
Colorado Party (1836–present)
National Party (1836–present)
National Alliance (Alianza Nacional)
Independent Party (2003–present)
Popular Unity (Unidad Popular) (2006–present)
March 26 Movement (Movimiento 26 de Marzo)
A new party was established in 2016, and some parliament members switched allegiance to it:
Party of the Folk (Partido de la Gente) (2016–present)

Unrepresented parties
Oriental Revolutionary Movement (Movimiento Revolucionario Oriental) (1961–present)
Civic Union (1971–present)
Workers' Party (1984–present)
Anti-imperialist Unitary Commissions (2008–present)
Ecologist Radical Intransigent Party (PERI) (2014–present)
Resistance Party(2017–present)
Digital Party (2015–present)
Green Animalist Party (2018–present)
Open Cabildo (2019–present)

Defunct parties
Constitutional Party (1880–1903)
Independent National Party (1931–???)
Black Native Party (1936–1944)
Liga Nacional de Acción Ruralista (1964–???)
Liberal Party (2002–2009)

Bibliography

See also
 Politics of Uruguay
 List of political parties by country
 Liberalism in Uruguay

Uruguay
 
Political parties
Political parties
Uruguay